Pseudeutreta adspersa is a species of tephritid or fruit flies in the genus Pseudeutreta of the family Tephritidae.

Distribution
Brazil

References

Tephritinae
Diptera of South America
Insects described in 1830